Oskar Thiede (February 13, 1879 – November 22, 1961) was an Austrian sculptor. He was born and died in Vienna. In 1948 he won a silver medal in the art competitions of the Olympic Games for his "Eight Sports Plaques".

References

External links
 profile

1879 births
1961 deaths
Austrian sculptors
Austrian male sculptors
Olympic silver medalists in art competitions
20th-century sculptors
Medalists at the 1948 Summer Olympics
Olympic competitors in art competitions